Ralston is a surname of Scottish origin. Notable people with the surname include:

Alexander Ralston, American architect
Anthony Ralston, Scottish football player
Aron Ralston, American mountain climber
Bill Ralston, New Zealand journalist
Bob Ralston, American pianist and organist
Brian Ralston, American composer
Bruce Ralston, Canadian politician
Chris Ralston, English rugby player
David Ralston (1954-2022), American politician
Dennis Ralston, American tennis player
Esther Ralston, American silent film actress
Gilbert Ralston, American writer
Gulliver Ralston, British musician
Harriet Newell Ralston (1828-1920), American poet
Harry Ralston, American screenwriter and director
James Ralston, Canadian lawyer, soldier, and politician
Jobyna Ralston, American silent film actress
John Ralston (disambiguation), several people
Joseph Ralston, American Vice Chairman of the Joint Chiefs of Staff
 Joseph S. Ralston, co-founder of the Ralston Steel Car Company 
Ken Ralston, American visual effects artist
Les Ralston, American boxer
Nick Ralston (born 1996), American football player
Norman Ralston, American pilot
Robert Ralston, American merchant and philanthropist
Rudy Ralston, American film producer
Samuel M. Ralston, governor of U.S. state of Indiana
Steve Ralston, American soccer player
Susan Ralston, American businesswoman
Vera Ralston, American actress
William Chapman Ralston, American businessman and financier
William Shedden Ralston, British scholar of Russian

References

Surnames of Scottish origin